The 2011 Super League of Belize (also known as the 2011 Belize Bank Super League Tournament) is a football league in Belize, which is not affiliated with the Football Federation of Belize. The league was founded in 2006.

Teams

League table

Results

Round 1:

Round 2:

Round 3:

(*) Game was abandoned at 2 – 0.

Round 4:

Round 5:

Round 6:

Round 7:

Round 8:

Round 9:

Round 10:

Round 11:

Round 12:

Round 13:

Round 14:

(*) Griga Knights forfeited the game, therefore Orange Walk United gained the win.

(*) Third World F.C. forfeited the game, therefore Placencia Assassin gained the win.

Playoffs
The playoffs will consist of the top four ranked teams from the regular season; Raymond Gentle-City Boys United, Orange Walk United, Paradise/Freedom Fighters and Placencia Assassin. The teams will play each other twice. The top two ranked teams will play a best of three Championship final series, with the winner being crowned as Champions.

League table

Results

Round 1:

Round 2:

Round 3:

Round 4:

Round 5:

Round 6:

Championship final Series

Game 1:

Game 2:

Top scorers

(*) Please note playoff goals are included.

Hat-tricks

 4 Player scored 4 goals

Awards
After the second Championship Final game, awards were distributed by the league.

See also
 Super League of Belize
 2008 Super League of Belize season

References

Super League of Belize seasons
2
Belize